The ETAP 48Ds is a Belgian sailboat that was designed by Marc-Oliver von Ahlen, with the interior designed by Stile Bertone, as a cruiser and first built in 2009.

The design was originally marketed by the manufacturer as the ETAP 46Ds.

Production
The design has built by ETAP Yachting in Belgium since 2009. It remained advertised as still in production in 2021.

Design
The ETAP 48Ds is a recreational keelboat, built predominantly of glassfibre. The construction is of a polyester glassfibre and closed-cell polyurethane foam sandwich, which provides buoyancy and makes the boat unsinkable. It has a fractional sloop rig, a raked stem, a reverse transom an internally mounted spade-type rudder controlled by a wheel and a fixed fin keel or shoal draft tandem keels. The fin keel version displaces  and carries  of ballast, while the tandem keel version displaces  and carries  of ballast.

The boat is fitted with a Japanese Yanmar 4JH4-TCE  diesel engine for docking and manoeuvring.

The design has sleeping accommodation for four people, with a double berth in the bow cabin and another in the aft cabin. The galley is located on the port side just forward of the companionway ladder. The galley is "L"-shaped and is equipped with a two-burner stove, a refrigerator and double sinks. There are two heads, one just aft of the bow cabin on the starboard side and one on the port side forward of the aft cabin. The main salon has a "U" shaped settee around a table and a second table opposite.

Operational history
The boat was at one time supported by a class club, the ETAP Owners Association.

See also
List of sailing boat types

References

External links

Keelboats
2000s sailboat type designs
Sailing yachts
Sailboat type designs by Marc-Oliver von Ahlen
Sailboat types built by ETAP Yachting